Balgarski izvor (Bulgarian springs) is a village in Teteven Municipality, Lovech Province, northern Bulgaria.

References

Villages in Lovech Province